Salmon Air is a commuter airline based in Salmon, Idaho, United States which was established in 1968.

History
Salmon Air's main hub was located at the Boise Airport (BOI). In addition to scheduled passenger and charter flights, Salmon Air also operated scenic air tour flights over Idaho's Bighorn Crags and Flying B Ranch. The airline was sold to McCall Aviation in 2009. The former owners of Salmon Air went on to found Gem Air in 2014. Salmon Air still operates out of Salmon Air and is still owned by McCall Aviation. Primarily a back country charter provider, Salmon Air provides air charter service into and around the Frank Church River of No Return Wilderness, as well as many other remote destination in Idaho for hikers, backpackers, rafters, hunters, etc.

Destinations
Salmon Air operates passenger flights to the following destinations:

Idaho 
Salmon / Lemhi County Airport (flights to Boise & McCall)
McCall / McCall Municipal Airport (flights to Boise & Salmon)
Boise / Boise Airport (flights to McCall & Salmon)

Utah 

Moab / Canyonlands Field (flights to Salt Lake City)
Salt Lake City / Salt Lake City International Airport (flights to Moab & Vernal)
Vernal / Vernal Regional Airport (flights to Salt Lake City)

Fleet
Salmon Air's fleet included the following aircraft:

Cessna 172 (3 passenger capacity)
Cessna 206 (5 passenger capacity)
Cessna 210 (5 passenger capacity)

Past Fleet

Cessna 208 (cargo)

Accidents and incidents
On December 6, 2004, Flight 1860, a Cessna 208, was on a scheduled cargo flight for the United States Postal Service from Salt Lake City to Sun Valley when it crashed about 7 miles south of Bellevue. Both crew members were killed.

See also 
 List of defunct airlines of the United States

References

Defunct airlines of the United States
Transportation in Lemhi County, Idaho
1968 establishments in Idaho
Defunct companies based in Idaho
Airlines established in 1968